California's 14th congressional district is a congressional district in the U.S. state of California. Eric Swalwell, a Democrat, has represented the district since January 2023.

As of the 2022 United States House of Representatives elections, the 14th district is in Alameda County and includes the cities of Hayward, Pleasanton, Livermore, Union City, Castro Valley, and parts of Dublin and Fremont. Immediately prior to that, the district included most of San Mateo County and the southwest side of San Francisco.

History

Recent election results from statewide races

Composition

Due to the 2020 redistricting, California's 14th congressional district has been shifted geographically to the East Bay. It encompasses most of Alameda County, except for the Oakland Area and the Tri-City Area, which are taken in by the 12th district and 17th district respectively. This district and the 12th are partitioned by Grant Ave, Union Pacific, Lewelling Blvd, Wicks Blvd, Manor Blvd, Juniper St, Dayton Ave, Padre Ave, Fargo Ave, Edgemoor St, Trojan Ave, Beatty St, Fleming St, Highway 880, Floresta Blvd, Halcyon Dr, Hesperian Blvd, Thornally Dr, Highway 185, 150th Ave, Highway 580, Benedict Dr, San Leandro Creek, and Lake Chabot Regional Park.This district and the 17th are partitioned by Mission Peak Regional Park, Witherly Ln, Mission Blvd, Washington Blvd, Farallon Cmn, Paseo Padre Parkway, Grimmer Blvd, Blacow Rd, Omar St, Butano Park Dr, Farina Ln, Nimitz Freeway, Highway 84. The 14th district takes in the north side of the city of Fremont, cities of Hayward, Livermore, Pleasanton, Union City, and Dublin, as well as the census-designated places Ashland, San Lorenzo, Cherryland, Fairview, and Castro Valley.

Cities & CDP with 10,000 or more people
 Hayward - 162,954
 Livermore - 87,955
 Pleasanton - 79,871
 Dublin - 72,589
 Union City - 70,143
 Castro Valley - 66,441
 San Lorenzo - 29,581
 Ashland - 23,823
 Cherryland - 15,808
 Fairview - 11,341

List of members representing the district

Election results

1932

1934

1936

1938

1940

1942

1944

1946

1948

1950

1952

1954

1956

1958

1960

1962

1964

1966 (Special)

1966

1968

1970

1972

1974

1976

1978

1980

1982

1984

1986

1988

1990

1992

1994

1996

1998

2000

2002

2004

2006

2008

2010

2012

2014

2016

2018

2020

Historical district boundaries

See also
List of United States congressional districts

References

External links
GovTrack.us: California's 14th congressional district
RAND California Election Returns: District Definitions (out of date)
California Voter Foundation map - CD14 (out of date)

14
Government of San Mateo County, California
Brisbane, California
Burlingame, California
Foster City, California
Half Moon Bay, California
Millbrae, California
Pacifica, California
Redwood City, California
San Bruno, California
San Carlos, California
San Mateo, California
Santa Cruz Mountains
South San Francisco, California
Government of San Francisco
Constituencies established in 1933
1933 establishments in California